Caladenia hastata, commonly known as Mellblom's spider orchid is a plant in the orchid family Orchidaceae and is endemic to Victoria. It is a ground orchid with a single hairy leaf and up to three white to cream-coloured flowers with red markings on the labellum.

Description
There is usually only a single flower but sometimes there are as many as three. The flowers are white to cream-coloured, sometimes with red markings. The sepals and petals have rather, club-like, dark brown glandular tips, and spread widely. Flowering occurs in October and November.

Taxonomy and naming
The species was first formally described by William Nicholls in 1942 and given the name Arachnorchis patersonii var. hastata from a specimen collected near Portland. The description was published in The Victorian Naturalist. In the same year, Herman Rupp changed the name to Caladenia hastata and the change was also published in The Victorian Naturalist. The specific epithet (hastata) is a Latin word meaning “spear-shaped” or "armed with a spear".

Distribution and habitat
Caladenia hastata grows in dense coastal heath in the Portland area. It is thought to have been common there before 1950 but then to have become extinct, until specimens were found at Point Danger. The numbers at Point Danger also declined until only six plants were recorded in 1996. Following conservation efforts, the numbers increased until there were about 740 plants recorded in five population.

Conservation
Caladenia hastata is listed as "endangered" under the Victorian Government Flora and Fauna Guarantee Act 1988 and the Australian Government Environment Protection and Biodiversity Conservation Act 1999. The main threats to the species weed invasion, especially by coast wattle (Acacia longifolia) and boneseed (Chrysanthemoides monilifera), road maintenance activity and pollution from a nearby aluminium smelter.

References

hastata
Plants described in 1942
Endemic orchids of Australia
Orchids of Victoria (Australia)